The Stamna  is a plosive aerophone (in this case implosive) and an idiophone  of the Greece.

Circle Stamna 
102 cm Primeter * 34 cm Height

Stamna with orifice 
102 cm Primeter * 42 cm Height

Traditional Stamna 
90 cm Primeter * 50 cm Height

References

See also
Amphora
Botija
Ghatam
Udu

Plosive aerophones
Struck idiophones played by hand
Greek musical instruments